Juha-Petteri Purolinna is a Finnish ice hockey defenceman who currently plays professionally in Finland for Lukko of the SM-liiga.

References

External links

Living people
Lukko players
Finnish ice hockey defencemen
1988 births
Ice hockey people from Helsinki